Donald Cook (September 26, 1901 – October 1, 1961) was an American stage and film actor who had a prolific career in pre-Code Hollywood films and on Broadway. Cook is perhaps best known for his film roles in The Public Enemy (1931), Safe in Hell (1931), Baby Face (1933), and Viva Villa! (1934), as well as for his stage role as David Naughton in Claudia, which ran for a total of 722 performances on Broadway between 1941 and 1943. He was the first actor to play Ellery Queen.

Biography
Cook was born and raised in Portland, Oregon, and originally studied farming but later worked for a lumber company. Cook attended the University of Oregon. One of his elder brothers was Ransom M. Cook, president of Wells Fargo Bank. He joined the Kansas Community Players and through this received an offer of stage work. He started screen work in "shorts" before going on to feature films.

Cook was known for his portrayal of Mike Powers in the film The Public Enemy. In 1935, Cook's starring role in the film The Spanish Cape Mystery made him the first actor in any medium to play fictional sleuth Ellery Queen. He played the role of Steve opposite Helen Morgan's Julie in the 1936 film adaptation of Show Boat, was one of the suspects in the Philo Vance mystery The Casino Murder Case, and starred as an heroic U.S. Immigrant Inspector of the Deporting Squad in the 1936 movie Ellis Island.

Cook made his Broadway debut in 1926 as Donn Cook in Seed of the Brute, and his New York theatrical career continued over the following three decades. His credits included a 1948 revival of Private Lives and the original 1951 Broadway run of The Moon Is Blue.

Personal life
During his 1930 summer stock engagement at Elitch Theatre, Cook met and fell in love with Frances Beranger, another member of the company. “We were in love, and she urged me to go to Hollywood,” Cook said. “I did, and we were married when she returned to the coast from Denver.” The marriage lasted six months. However, “the prestige of my Elitch engagement helped me get my first Hollywood contract – with Warner Brothers.”

Cook was married to Princess Gioia Tasca di Cuto, from 1937 until his death in 1961 (although they were legally separated at the time) from a heart attack in New Haven, Connecticut, five days after his 60th birthday, in the midst of rehearsals for Cook's new play, A Shot in the Dark, an adaptation of L'Idiote. Walter Matthau took over Cook's leading role in the play following his death.

Cook is buried at River View Cemetery in Portland, Oregon. 

For his contributions to the motion picture industry, Cook was honored with a Hollywood Walk of Fame star located at 1718 Vine Street.

Filmography

Television

Stage credits

Broadway
Seed of the Brute (1926)
New York Exchange (1927)
Spellbound (1927)
Paris Bound (1927)
Half Gods (1929)
Rebound (1930)
Wine of Choice (1938)
American Landscape (1938)
Skylark (1939)
Claudia (1941)
Foolish Notion (1945)
Made in Heaven (1946)
Portrait in Black (1947)
Private Lives (1948)
The Moon Is Blue (1951)
King of Hearts (1954)
Champagne Complex (1955)
Goodbye Again (1956)
Love Me Little (1958)

Masquerade (1959)

References

External links

American male film actors
American male stage actors
1901 births
1961 deaths
Male actors from Portland, Oregon
20th-century American male actors
20th-century American singers
University of Oregon alumni
Burials in Oregon
Burials at River View Cemetery (Portland, Oregon)